Wizards of Waverly Place is an American fantasy teen sitcom created by Todd J. Greenwald that aired on Disney Channel for four seasons between October 2007 and January 2012. The series centers on Alex Russo (Selena Gomez), a teenage wizard living on the titular street in the Greenwich Village section of New York City, who undertakes training alongside her siblings, Justin (David Henrie) and Max (Jake T. Austin), who are also equipped with magical abilities. The siblings are trained knowing that one day they will compete to win sole custody of their family's powers. Episodes focus on Alex's challenges in keeping her secret powers hidden while she deals with the social and personal issues of her youth. She frequently uses magic in her everyday life, sometimes irresponsibly, and develops her supernatural abilities over the course of the series. The main themes depicted include family, friendship, and adolescence; the series also contains fantasy elements.

The Walt Disney Company developed the series to follow on from its successful line of comedy series in the 2000s, including Lizzie McGuire, The Suite Life of Zack & Cody and Hannah Montana. It's a Laugh Productions produced the program and it premiered on Disney Channel on October12, 2007. A made-for-television film adaptation, Wizards of Waverly Place: The Movie aired on the network in 2009 and was awarded a Primetime Emmy Award for Outstanding Children's Program in 2010. The series ended on January6, 2012, to allow Gomez to take on more mature roles. After its conclusion, the cast returned for a stand-alone television special, The Wizards Return: Alex vs. Alex, in 2013.

Wizards of Waverly Place enjoyed consistently high viewership in the United States on broadcast television and tie-ins included merchandise, a soundtrack album and video game adaptations. Television critics praised the show for its humor and cast; Gomez's affiliation with the network led to a prominent musical career apart from the program. Wizards of Waverly Place won two additional Emmys for Outstanding Children's Program in 2009 and 2012, as well as two Artios Awards from the Casting Society of America for Outstanding Achievement in CastingChildren's Series Programmingbetween 2009 and 2012. Its series finale was the most-watched final episode of any Disney Channel show.

Premise

Story and characters

Alex, Justin and Max Russo are three teenage wizards-in-training living in an apartment on Waverly Place in Greenwich Village, Manhattan, New York City. In his spare time, their father Jerry Russo, a former wizard, provides his children with daily lessons in their secret lair on how to use magic responsibly. Jerry and his wife Theresa run a family business, a sandwich shop designed to look like a subway station, on the ground level of their apartment building. According to the rules of the "Wizard World", once they complete their training, the Russo children will compete to determine which sibling will retain their powers permanently and become the sole wizard of the family. Since the other children will eventually lose their powers, Jerry tries to teach them not to become dependent on magic. Jerry descends from a family of wizards and won his own family's competition as a teenager, but relinquished his powers when he married Theresa, who is a mortal. His powers were transferred to his younger brother, Kelbo. Alex must keep her powers hidden from her best friend, Harper Finkle, which causes an occasional strain on their relationship. Alex reveals her secret to Harper in the second season; however, the existence of wizards must remain hidden to the wider mortal world.

In the third season Harper moves in with the Russo family and Max's efforts to win the family wizard competition become more serious. Leading into the fourth and final season Alex and Justin are both tricked into exposing the existence of wizards to government officials and a group of reporters. It is revealed that the whole scenario was a test devised as part of their training, and consequently, Alex and Justin are demoted to lower positions in the family competition. Alex is overwhelmed by her loss of progress and quits; she later rejoins to continue dating her werewolf boyfriend, Mason Greyback. Meanwhile, Justin becomes a tutor for a group of delinquent wizards, which assists him in recovering his position in the competition. At the conclusion of the series, the siblings compete to see who will retain their supernatural abilities. Alex wins the family wizard competition and is awarded full magic powers, while Justin is allowed to retain his abilities when he assumes the role of headmaster at WizTech, a boarding school for young wizards-in-training. Max loses his powers but becomes the new manager of the family's sandwich shop, also securing investments from the wizard world.

Themes
The series deals with the theme of secret identities. It explores the fantasy that children may experience of wanting magical powers, in the same way Hannah Montana explores the fantasy of being a pop star. Series such as Sabrina the Teenage Witch and the Harry Potter franchise, and a trend towards the fantasy television genre, made stories about children with magical powers popular. Episodes of Wizards of Waverly Place typically show the Russo children using magic to solve an issue in their personal lives quickly, but they learn not to become dependent on their powers, as only one of the siblings is expected to retain them following the family competition. The children try to live normal lives; the show presents the idea that life can be enjoyable without magic. Conflicts in the series arise from Alex's struggle to balance both her private and her public life; her identity is built upon the magical powers which she must keep hidden. Scholar Colin Ackerman suggests that the concept of magic in the series is a form of social privilege and the Russo children are encouraged to keep their advantage hidden. He believed that the characters are influenced by consumer-driven values, for things which they are easily able to attain using magic.

The program's stories center on family, friends and growing up. The Russo family is depicted as working class and they run a family business in the service industry. Jerry and Theresa teach their children the significance of family, hard work and responsibility; the characters regularly learn lessons such as the importance of staying true to one's self. Academic Heidi Denzel de Tirado argued that Alex understands the depth of family values only during the wizard competition, when she and Justin decide to set aside their personal success for the benefit of family. The series explores family heritage; the Russo family have a mixed backgroundItalian, Mexican and Americanbut their culture is not prominently featured in most episodes, with occasional exceptions such as Alex's quinceañera. Scholar Morgan Genevieve Blue said Alex is designed to be representative of Latina-American girlhood.

Production

Development

In the early 2000s, The Walt Disney Company found success through its pay television network Disney Channel with a pattern of original comedy series for a tween and family audience, such as Lizzie McGuire, The Suite Life of Zack & Cody and Hannah Montana. The network planned to build on these successes with a new comedy series aimed at girls. Wizards of Waverly Place was created by Todd J. Greenwald, who had previously worked on the first season of Hannah Montana. He had also worked on a pilot for NBC; Disney hired him after seeing it. Greenwald adopted the network's idea of a show centering on a family of wizards. The series is set in a fictionalized version of Waverly Place in Greenwich Village. Peter Murrieta had worked previously on the sitcom Hope & Faith in New York City and had moved to Los Angeles before being approached by Disney to help develop the series. When Murrieta joined the project as an executive producer, it was titled The Amazing O'Malleys; he thought they would produce only a pilot. He had never produced a show targeted at a youth audience and was apprehensive about being involved. Murrieta helped guide the writing and casting throughout the development process and re-wrote the pilot. Adam Bonnett, a Disney Channel programming executive, cited the influence of sitcoms Bewitched and I Dream of Jeannie on the series.

Disney executives first became aware of Selena Gomez at an open casting call in Texas at age twelve, and she went on to appear in guest roles on Disney Channel programs, including The Suite Life of Zack & Cody. The network saw potential in Gomez and wanted her to star in a full series. She filmed two pilots for the network, Arwin! (a spin-off of The Suite Life of Zack & Cody) and Stevie Sanchez (a spin-off of Lizzie McGuire); neither of these series were green-lit, but Gomez was ultimately cast in Wizards of Waverly Place. The unaired pilot was set in a magic store and featured only two siblings, twins Jordan and Julia. The show was green-lit after this pilot. Gomez was attached to the series by February 2007, as well as David Henrie and Jake T. Austin; the characters were named Brooke, Sully and Max O'Malley at this stage. In March 2007 the network officially announced Disney's Wizards as an upcoming comedy to premiere in the fall. At the time of the announcement, the characters were named Alexa, Aaron and Max Esposito. Greenwald and Murrieta served as executive producers; Murrieta changed the family's surname to Russo and wrote the children as mixed-race. Gomez appeared in a guest role on Hannah Montana as cross-promotion for the new series; Wizards would eventually be aired in a timeslot after its peer series.

Casting

Selena Gomez portrays the central character of Alex Russo. Gomez had left traditional school after the seventh grade and moved to Los Angeles. She sings the series' theme song, "Everything Is Not What It Seems". Her band Selena Gomez & the Scene was signed by Disney to their label, Hollywood Records; Gomez subsequently pursued a prominent solo music career. Alex has been described as dark, crass and a jerk, as well as a "wisecracking underachiever". She is characterized by her tomboyish, rebellious and lazy attitude. Gomez asked for her character to remain edgy to resemble her own style. Jennifer Aniston's portrayal of Rachel Green on Friends inspired Gomez, who adopted similar mannerisms while playing Alex.

David Henrie plays Justin Russo, who is considered to be sarcastic. Greenwald described Justin as a nerd, in comparison to Alex's "tough female character". Henrie wrote two episodes of the series, "Alex's Logo" and "Meet the Werewolves". Max Russo is portrayed by Jake T. Austin, who said the character was unintelligent, but becomes slightly smarter toward the end of the series. His character was temporarily transformed into a younger female in the fourth season because of a magic spell; Bailee Madison played the female counterpart, Maxine, while Austin took a hiatus from the program. Maria Canals-Barrera plays the children's mother Theresa Russo; David DeLuise plays their father Jerry Russo. The parents are described by Barry Garron of The Hollywood Reporter as loving but "slightly goofy". DeLuise and Austin were not featured in the unaired pilot. Jennifer Stone portrays Alex's best friend, Harper, who was described as "comic relief" by Boston.coms Joanna Weiss. Stone had previously auditioned for a Disney Channel pilot called Bus Life, which was not picked up. She originally planned to audition for the role of Alex on Wizards before being cast as Harper, and stated that she "fought" to become a series regular. Guest stars during the course of the series include Bridgit Mendler as Juliet van Heusen, Justin's vampire girlfriend, and Gregg Sulkin as Mason Greyback, Alex's werewolf boyfriend.

Writing and filming
Wizards of Waverly Place was filmed at Hollywood Center Studios. The series was renewed for a third season in May 2009, with eight episodes added to the order in September.

Murrieta chose to write the Russo family as mixed-race, and he felt that the argumentative relationships between the Russo siblings resembled those of his childhood. Greenwald believed that the brother–sister dynamic was at the heart of the show.

The series was renewed for a fourth season in June 2010; Murrieta left the program in April prior to the renewal. Vince Cheung and Ben Montanio became the new showrunners and executive producers alongside Greenwald; Gomez announced in July that it would be the final season of the program. Austin claimed the series ended to allow Gomez to pursue more mature roles; The A.V. Clubs Marah Eakin speculated that Gomez had become more popular than the show itself and it was time for her to move on. The series finale aired on January6, 2012; the episode depicts the family's wizard competition.

Series overview

Reception

Critical reception
Wizards of Waverly Place has received positive reviews for its actors and their comedic skills. Marah Eakin felt that it was a positive departure from Disney's typical series, with minimal slapstick humor but still having exaggerated acting. Gomez was praised for her comic timing and sarcastic delivery; the Los Angeles Timess Mary McNamara described her portrayal of Alex as "sweet and sassy". Additionally, McNamara believed that Justin and Max did not serve as comic relief; Jake T. Austin was called "absurdly hilarious" by blogger Mark Robinson. The central characters were described as "cute, precocious, but far from angelic" by Garron, who said child viewers would want to watch more. In addition to the cast and humor, the series' concept and themes were also praised. Critics suggested that the series capitalized on the success of the Harry Potter franchise, and it was also compared to Bewitched for the similarities in their magical elements. It was listed as one of Disney's best sitcoms by Robinson, who wrote that the series combined fantasy and comedy "seamlessly". While the fourth season was on air, Eakin said the quality of the series had not diminished, and has a lot of heart, depth and "actual feeling". McNamara praised the show for not relying on shtick or its laugh track.

Some characters were criticized by reviewers; Paul Asay of Christian website Plugged In did not view Alex as a positive role model because of her rebellious nature, and the parents were described as foolish by Weiss. Ackerman found fault with the show's contradictory messages, saying there are never consequences for the Russo children abusing their magical powers; he felt that the characters seem to forget the lessons they learn and continue to make the same mistakes. The lessons Jerry teaches about how to live life without magic were interpreted as pointless, as when the series ends, both Alex and Justin retain their abilities. The setting of Greenwich Village was also problematic for Ackerman, as he suggested that the Russos, a working-class family, would not be financially able to live in one of the most expensive New York neighborhoods. The show has been criticized for its predictable premise and supernatural elements, described as "less magical than milquetoast" by Weiss. Reviewing the series finale, Eakin criticized the quality of the wizards' robe costuming and the use of a laugh track. Critics have found fault with the program's special effects, such as the computer animation of a griffin. Asay referred to the program's depiction of angels as "spiritually misleading".

U.S. television ratings
Wizards of Waverly Place premiered on October12, 2007, on the same night as the network's premiere of Twitches Too, and attracted 5.9million viewers. The one-hour series finale, "Who Will Be the Family Wizard?", aired on January6, 2012, and became the show's most-watched episode, with an audience of 9.8million. It was the finale with the highest rating for any Disney Channel series.

Awards and nominations

Other media

Films and specials
Disney Channel asked the series executive team, including Murrieta and Greenwald, to adapt the series into a made-for-television film. Wizards of Waverly Place: The Movie aired on the network on August28, 2009, and starred Gomez, Henrie, Austin, Stone, Canals-Barrera and DeLuise. It was filmed on location in San Juan, Puerto Rico, and depicts the Russo family on a Caribbean vacation. In the film, which was written by Dan Berendsen, Alex unintentionally performs a magic spell which alters history so that her parents have never met. The broadcast had 11.4million viewers, and won a Primetime Emmy Award in 2010 for Outstanding Children's Program. A second television film was ordered in June 2010, scheduled to enter production in 2011. In 2012, however, Austin said it had been canceled because of the maturing careers of the cast. Berendsen was to write the screenplay.

It was reported in September 2012 that an hour-long television special, The Wizards Return: Alex vs. Alex, would be produced for the network, with Gomez in an executive producer role alongside Cheung, Dan Cross and David Hoge. Gomez, Austin, Stone, Canals-Barrera, DeLuise and Sulkin returned for the special which began filming in October in Los Angeles. The special depicts the Russo family traveling to Tuscany, Italy, to meet with relatives, before Alex accidentally casts a spell which creates a good and evil version of herself. Cheung, Montanio and Berendsen wrote the screenplay, and Victor Gonzalez directed. The special premiered on March15, 2013, watched by 5.9million viewers.

Malaysian adaptation
A Malaysian adaptation of the series, Wizards of Warna Walk, was produced for Disney Channel in Southeast Asia in 2019. The series ran for 14episodes and was filmed at Pinewood Studios in Johor, over two months. Set in Kuala Lumpur, the adaptation was designed to use local actors, music compositions, the Malaysian language and Asian values. Network executives considered adapting other series such as Hannah Montana, but ultimately found that Wizards resonated the best with test audiences. Wizards of Warna Walk was broadcast in Malaysia, Singapore, Indonesia, Thailand and the Philippines.

Merchandising
Walt Disney Records released a soundtrack album for the series on August4, 2009, including songs from, and inspired by, the series and film. Disney Interactive Studios released two video games based on the series for the Nintendo DS: Wizards of Waverly Place in August 2009, and Wizards of Waverly Place: Spellbound in November 2010.

Rumored revival
The possibility of a reunion series has been mentioned by several main cast members since 2017. In August 2020, Henrie commented that all key actors were open to producing a revival of the series. He clarified that formal discussions with Disney had not yet occurred.

In October 2017, Greenwald said he would like to see Wizards of Waverly Place continue with a high-budget feature film in the vein of Harry Potter. He also shared an idea for a prequel series which would follow Jerry as he attended WizTech in his high school years, and would feature his siblings. Henrie suggested that the revival could revolve around a disconnected Russo family, several years later, who are all finding success separately but must learn to come together again.

Rewatch podcast
It was teased in December 2022 that DeLuise and Stone would begin hosting a podcast entitled Wizards of Waverly Pod. The podcast premiered on February 6, 2023, through the podcast network PodCo owned by Christy Carlson Romano. Gomez will feature as a guest.

Notes

Citations

Bibliography

External links

Official website

 
2000s American teen sitcoms
2010s American teen sitcoms
2007 American television series debuts
2012 American television series endings
Disney Channel original programming
Emmy Award-winning programs
English-language television shows
American fantasy television series
Wizards in television
Television shows set in New York City
Television about magic
Television series about families
Television series by It's a Laugh Productions
Latino sitcoms
Hispanic and Latino American television
Television shows remade overseas